Mangalgarh may refer to:

 Mangalgarh, Bhopal, a village in the Berasia tehsil of Madhya Pradesh, India
 Mangalgarh, Samastipur, a village in the Hasanpur Tehsil of Samastipur, Bihar, India
 Mangalgad, a fort in Maharashtra near the village of Dudhanewadi